Amblyseius cupulus is a species of mite in the family Phytoseiidae.

References

cupulus
Articles created by Qbugbot
Animals described in 1989